Obeyesekere Walauwa aka Maligawa (Sinhalese: Palace) is a large bungalow (as mansions are erroneously referred to locally) in Colombo, Sri Lanka. A stately home in the Tropical Neoclassical style, it was used as a town house by the Obeyesekere family, even though at its construction it was situated on a marsh at the edge of Cinnamon Gardens a suburb of Colombo, now part of Greater Colombo Area.

Built in the 1890s, with a 5-acre garden and extravagant interior fittings, by the wealthy and powerful Obeyesekere family, headed by Sir James Peter Obeyesekere II, Kt, MA who was the First Mudaliyar highest post for a Ceylonese in the British Colonial Administration of Ceylon at the time.

In 1939, Sir James on request of the Royal College Colombo, granted the house with its furniture for the use of the school as a hostel after the school attempted to reestablish a hostel after absence of one for students from out station for several years. However in December 1941 with the out break of World War II in the far east, the Maligawa along with the Royal College premise was taken over by the British Army. As the school was turned into a military hospital, the Maligawa soon became the officer's mess for the Royal Air Force that had covered the Colombo Race Course to an airfield.

Several years after the war it was returned to the Obeyesekere family, and it became the home of Deshamanya J.P. Obeyesekere III former senator and minister of health & finance; his wife Siva Obeyesekere, a former minister of health.

External links

Royal College, Colombo
Houses in Colombo
Manor houses in Sri Lanka